The Banaras Hindu University women's rights protest is a series of events beginning with a Banaras Hindu University student's September 2017 complaint that the university administration treats women unfairly.

Harassment incident
On 21 September 2017 a woman reported sexual harassment to the university. She claimed that the university responded by blaming her.

Protests

The next day, 22 September, students organized a protest of the university's treatment of women.

The university's administration filed a First information report against hundreds of students and alleged outsiders for rioting, mischief indented arson, attempt to murder among other sections of Indian Penal Code.

Security officers used violence in an attempt to get protesters to disperse the protestors. Various protesters reported injuries. Alleged outsiders joined students in stone-pelting.

The protests in Benares triggered protests in Delhi. 

At the one year anniversary of the protest students organized another protest. The protesters reported that an Akhil Bharatiya Vidyarthi Parishad student group attacked them violently for protesting.

Reactions
The university criticized the girl who made the original complaint for being out at night. 

Chief Proctor of the university resigned taking moral responsibility.

PM Modi discussed a response with the chief minister.

Uttar Pradesh Governor called the incident sad 

Uttar Pradesh Chief Minister Yogi Adityanath recommended better communication as a way to prevent future such protests.

A committee was set-up under Uttar Pradesh Chief Secretary.

In May 2018, following-up on an inquiry report, the university administration debarred 11 students on charges of vandalism and assault.

References

Banaras Hindu University
2017 protests
Gatherings of women
2017 in India